Meit Parish is a civil parish of Baradine County, New South Wales.

Located at 30°25'54.0"S 148°49'04.0"E on the Pillager Road south of Pilliga, New South Wales, the parish is located on the border of the Pilliga Forest.

References

Localities in New South Wales
Geography of New South Wales